Electoral district no. 3 was one of the multi-member electoral districts of the Riigikogu, the national legislature of Estonia. The district was established in 1992 when the Riigikogu was re-established following Estonia's independence from the Soviet Union. It was abolished in 1995. It covered west Tallinn.

Election results

Detailed

1992
Results of the 1992 parliamentary election held on 20 September 1992:

The following candidates were elected:
 Personal mandates - Valve Kirsipuu (M), 9,051 votes; and Ülo Nugis (I), 5,330 votes.
 Compensatory mandates - Andres Heinapuu (I), 97 votes; Jüri Luik (I), 2,293 votes; Aap Neljas (I), 121 votes; Vello Saatpalu (M), 455 votes; Riivo Sinijärv (KK), 1,640 votes; and Andra Veidemann (R), 562 votes.

References

03
03
03
Riigikogu electoral district, 3